Put Grandma in the Freezer is a 2018 black comedy film directed by Giancarlo Fontana and Giuseppe Stasi.

Cast
Fabio De Luigi as Simone Recchia
Miriam Leone as Claudia Maria Lusi
Lucia Ocone as Rossana
Marina Rocco as Margie
Francesco Di Leva as Gennaro
Susy Laude as Marta
Carlo De Ruggieri as Palumbo
Maurizio Lombardi as Rambaudo
Eros Pagni as Augusto
Barbara Bouchet as grandma Birgit
Giovanni Esposito as the corrupt politician
Paolo Bessegato as the General
Nando Irene as Giorgio / Ugo Lavecchia

References

External links

2018 films
2010s Italian-language films
2018 black comedy films
Italian black comedy films
2010s Italian films